The Exterminating Angel is a 1962 Mexican surrealist film written and directed by Luis Buñuel, starring Silvia Pinal, and produced by Pinal's then-husband Gustavo Alatriste. It tells the story of a group of wealthy guests who find themselves unable to leave after a lavish dinner party, and the chaos that ensues. Sharply satirical and allegorical, the film contains a depiction of the aristocracy that suggests they "harbor savage instincts and unspeakable secrets".

In 2004, The New York Times included the film in a list of "The Best 1,000 Movies Ever Made". The film was adapted into an opera of the same name in 2016.

Plot
After a night at the opera, Edmundo and Lucía Nóbile are having 18 wealthy acquaintances over for a dinner party at their lavish mansion. The servants inexplicably begin to leave as the guests are about to arrive and, by the time the meal is over, only Julio, the majordomo, is left. Lucía cancels a planned surprise involving a bear and three sheep upon discovering that guest Sergio Russell does not like jokes, but there are a few strange occurrences, such as the guests somehow entering the mansion and going upstairs twice, Edmundo repeating his toast to the opera singer Silvia, and Cristián Ugalde and Leandro Gomez greeting each other three times (as strangers, cordially, and antagonistically).

The guests mingle before adjourning to the salon to listen to Blanca play a piano sonata by Paradisi. When she finishes, she says she is tired, and several other guests indicate they are about to go home, but no one does. Instead, without discussing it, the guests and hosts settle in and spend the night on the couches, chairs, and floor of the salon, preventing Lucía from sneaking off for a tryst with Colonel Alvaro Aranda, while Julio sleeps at the table in the dining room.

In the morning, it is discovered that Sergio is unconscious. The hosts and some of the guests wonder why no one attempted to leave the night before. A few guests try to exit the salon, but they all turn back or become distressed and stop before crossing the threshold. When Julio brings some leftovers for breakfast, he is trapped as well.

By that evening, everyone is on edge. They are using a closet as a toilet and have run out of clean water. Raúl blames Eduardo for their plight, but Leticia defends the host. Sergio dies during the night, and Dr. Carlos Conde and Alvaro put the corpse in a closet to prevent the sight of it from further worrying their peers.

A crowd of onlookers, police, and soldiers gathers outside the gates of the mansion over the following days and finds no one is able to enter, though there is no physical barrier. The trapped individuals get water by tapping into a pipe in the wall, but their good manners continue to deteriorate. A growing number of them become ill, and Dr. Conde has no medicine, until Edmundo shows him a stash of opiates, which some of the guests sneak for themselves.

At a particularly heated moment, the trapped group sees the three sheep and bear roaming the mansion. The sheep wander into the salon, where they are caught and roasted on a fire in the middle of the room. While the food calms things down somewhat, it does little to raise spirits, and Eduardo and Beatriz, a young engaged couple, kill themselves in a closet.

One night, all of the Nóbiles's
servants are drawn back to the mansion. Inside, Raúl has convinced most of the other guests that their predicament will end if Edmundo dies. Dr. Conde attempts to reason with them, and a fight breaks out, the doctor assisted by Alvaro and Julio. Edmundo and Leticia come out of the curtained-off area they have begun to inhabit (Lucía is now openly with Alvaro), and Edmundo offers to take his own life. He gets a small pistol he had hidden, but Leticia tells him to wait. She says all of the people and furniture are in the same spot as the night of the party, and has Blanca play the end of the piano sonata and everyone repeat the conversation that followed.

This time, when Blanca says she is tired, the group finds they can leave the salon, and then the mansion. The members of the small crowd outside see them exit and are able to pass through the gates to greet them.

To give thanks for their salvation, most of the group from the salon attend a Te Deum service. Afterward, neither the clergy, nor the churchgoers, can leave the cathedral. Some time later, the military fires on a group of people and drives them away from the cathedral gates. A flock of sheep enters the building as the screams and gunshots continue.

Cast

The Trapped
 Silvia Pinal as Leticia, nicknamed "La Valkiria" ("The Valkyrie")
 Jacqueline Andere as Alicia de Roc, Alberto's much younger wife
 José Baviera as Leandro Gomez, who lives in New York
 Augusto Benedico as Dr. Carlos Conde
 Luis Beristáin as  Cristián Ugalde, Rita's husband, who has an ulcer and is a Freemason
 Antonio Bravo as Sergio Russell, an older guest who does not like jokes and is the first to die
 Claudio Brook as Julio, the majordomo
 César del Campo as Colonel Alvaro Aranda, who is having an affair with Lucía
 Rosa Elena Durgel as Silvia, an opera singer
 Lucy Gallardo as Lucía de Nóbile, Edmundo's wife and the hostess of the party
 Enrique García Álvarez as Alberto Roc, Alicia's elderly husband, who is a conductor and a Freemason
 Ofelia Guilmáin as Juana Avila, Francisco's overprotective sister
 Nadia Haro Oliva as Ana Maynar, who was once in a train wreck and is interested in Kabbalah
 Tito Junco as Raúl, who walks with a cane
 Xavier Loyá as Francisco Avila, Juana's brother
 Xavier Massé as Eduardo, Beatriz's fiancé
 Ofelia Montesco as Beatriz, Eduardo's fiancée
 Patricia Morán as Rita Ugalde, Christian's wife, who is pregnant
 Patricia de Morelos as Blanca, a pianist
 Bertha Moss as Leonora, a woman who has cancer and is Dr. Conde's patient
 Enrique Rambal as Edmundo Nóbile, Lucía's husband and the host of the party

The Rest
 Pancho Córdova as Lucas, the doorman, who is the first servant to leave
 Ángel Merino as the waiter who trips and drops a tray of food
 Luis Lomelí as the mayor's representative
 Guillermo Álvarez Bianchi as Pablo, the chef
 Elodia Hernández as Camila, the older maid
 Florencio Castelló as the bald waiter
 Eric del Castillo as Deacon Sampson, who tutors and cares for the Ugalde children and takes part in the Te Deum service at the end of the film
 Chel López as the military official who tells the mayor's representative that his men were unable to enter the mansion
 David Hayat (credited as David Hayyad Cohen) as Pablo's sous-chef
 Janet Alcoriza as the younger maid (uncredited)
 Roberto Meyer as the "crazy" onlooker who is not allowed to try to get inside the mansion (uncredited)
 Rita Macedo as a churchgoer (uncredited)

Production

The film was shot in less than six weeks, from January 29 to March 9, 1962. American actress Marilyn Monroe traveled to Mexico during that period, and her trip included a visit to Churubusco Studios, where the film was being made. She visited the set and met Luis Buñuel, photographer Gabriel Figueroa, and the cast members of the film, with whom she took some pictures.

Release and reception
The Exterminating Angel premiered at the 1962 Cannes Film Festival, and was released in theaters in Mexico on October 1, 1964. It received critical acclaim. On the review aggregator website Rotten Tomatoes, the film has an approval rating of 93% based on 27 reviews, with an average score of 9.0/10; the site's "critics consensus" reads: "Societal etiquette devolves into depravity in Luis Buñuel's existential comedy, effectively playing the absurdity of civilization for mordant laughs."

Awards
This film received the International Federation of Film Critics (FIPRESCI) Prize at the 1962 Cannes Film Festival. At the 1963 Bodil Awards, it won the award for Best Non-European Film.

Home media
The Criterion Collection released The Exterminating Angel on DVD on 10 February 2009, and on Blu-ray in November 2016.

Analysis

Social class
Though Buñuel never explained how to interpret the film, leaving it to each viewer to decide for themselves, American film critic Roger Ebert wrote a lengthy interpretation of the film's symbolism, which includes the following paragraph: "The dinner guests represent the ruling class in Franco's Spain. Having set a banquet table for themselves by defeating the workers in the Spanish Civil War, they sit down for a feast, only to find it never ends. They're trapped in their own bourgeois cul-de-sac. Increasingly resentful at being shut off from the world outside, they grow mean and restless; their worst tendencies are revealed."

Scholar Robert Stam said in his book Reflexivity in Film and Literature: From Don Quixote to Jean-Luc Godard that the film "is structured on the comic formula of a slow descent from normality into anarchy ... The '  Angel' executes a mission of social justice, an apocalyptic laying low of the noble and the powerful."

Influence on the horror genre
In a piece on the horror film website Bloody Disgusting, Samuel Pierce noted parallels between The Exterminating Angel and the contemporary horror film, writing: "Within the film's already fascinating plot, there's plenty of poignant social commentary that will be just as familiar to horror fans. Though the film can be interpreted a number of ways, many of its themes are undeniable and as relevant today as they ever were. We see isolation drive madness. We see tribes form in times of strife. We see murder become more and more appealing. More than anything, however, The Exterminating Angel explores the hypocrisy of the social elite and the thin strands of society that keep them from utter depravity."

Rather than a precursor to many contemporary horror films, some critics have classified The Exterminating Angel as a horror film itself. For example, Jonathan Romney of The Guardian called it a straightforward "claustrophobic horror story", and film scholar Jonathan Rosenbaum classified it as a "comic horror film."

Cultural references
 A 1995 episode of the British sitcom One Foot in the Grave is titled "The Exterminating Angel", referring to a scene in which numerous characters are trapped in a conservatory (though unlike the film, they are physically locked in).
 The 1999 album Anima Animus by The Creatures includes a song titled "Exterminating Angel".
 The 2002 Buffy the Vampire Slayer episode "Older and Far Away" references the film when a set of characters is unable to leave a house after a party. Initially, the characters seems to be psychologically unable to leave, but later they desire to leave and physically cannot due to a spell.
 In the 2011 Woody Allen film Midnight in Paris, the main character, Gil, travels back in time to 1920s Paris and suggests a story to a perplexed young Luis Buñuel about guests who arrive for a dinner party and can’t leave. Allen references the film again in Rifkin's Festival (2020).
 An 1895 sculpture by Josep Llimona titled The Exterminating Angel can be found in the cemetery of Comillas, Cantabria, Spain. The cemetery is constructed over the remains of a 15th century church.

See also
 The Discreet Charm of the Bourgeoisie (French: Le Charme discret de la bourgeoisie) – a 1972 Buñuel film with a similar premise and themes
 The Last Days (Spanish: Los Últimos Días) – a 2013 Spanish film in which humanity becomes scared to go outside

References

External links

 
 
 The Exterminating Angel: Exterminating Civilization an essay by Marsha Kinder at the Criterion Collection
 Cinema Then, Cinema Now: The Exterminating Angel a 1992 discussion of the film hosted by Jerry Carlson of CUNY TV

1962 films
1962 comedy-drama films
1960s avant-garde and experimental films
1960s fantasy comedy-drama films
1960s Mexican films
Estudios Churubusco films
Films about parties
Films about social class
Films about the upper class
Films adapted into operas
Films directed by Luis Buñuel
Films set in country houses
Mexican black comedy films
Mexican black-and-white films
Mexican fantasy comedy-drama films
Mexican films based on plays
Surreal comedy films